Aaron Mitchell (d. April 12, 1967) was executed in the gas chamber for murdering police officer Arnold Gamble in Sacramento on February 15, 1963.

Mitchell was the last person to be executed in California before the Supreme Court of California ruled in 1972 that capital punishment was unconstitutional (the Supreme Court of the United States made a similar ruling later that year). He was the 194th person to be executed by gassing in California (1937–67), and the only person to be executed in that state during the term of Governor Ronald Reagan (1967–1975). Both Reagan and his predecessor had declined clemency. Mitchell's case had been heard twice by the US Supreme Court and twice by the California Supreme Court.

Prior to his execution, he was visited by renowned psychiatrist, Holocaust survivor, and author of Man's Search for Meaning, Dr. Viktor Frankl in lieu of last rites. Shortly thereafter, Mitchell held an unorthodox press conference during which he declared in a typewritten statement that "I have made my appeal to God and to the Governor. This is my last appeal to Man. Forgive me, for I knew not." The San Francisco Chronicle documented him saying "I don't really expect clemency from the Governor and I sympathize with him. He will be under criticism either way, but under much lighter criticism if he fails to act for me." He also feared that his own execution may spur "a long new line to the gas chamber." His last words were "I am Jesus Christ!" He was 37.

There were no further executions in California until 1992, when Robert Alton Harris was gassed. The gas chamber was ruled unconstitutional in California in 1996.

See also
 Capital punishment in California

References

External links
O'Shea, Kathleen A.; Conrad, Ann Patrick Women and the Death Penalty in the United States, 1900-1998, pp. 74–76. Greenwood Publishing Group, 1999, 

1930 births
1967 deaths
American people executed for murdering police officers
20th-century executions of American people
20th-century executions by California
People convicted of murder by California
People executed by California by gas chamber